The La Crosse Catbirds was an American basketball team based in La Crosse, Wisconsin and member of the Continental Basketball Association.  The Catbirds were the 1990 and 1992 CBA champions.  The team moved to La Crosse from Louisville in 1985, and left La Crosse for Pittsburgh in May 1994.  La Crosse would see the CBA return in 1995 when the La Crosse Bobcats took to the court.

Widely known as the training ground for future NBA coach Flip Saunders, who led the team to both championships.

Several future and previous NBA players played for the Catbirds, including Andre Turner, David Rivers, Mark Davis, Derrick Gervin, Elliot Perry, Jaren Jackson, Kevin Lynch, Dennis Nutt and Kenny Battle.

Season By Season

Notable players
Brad Leaf

References

Continental Basketball Association teams
Defunct basketball teams in the United States
Basketball teams in Wisconsin
Sports in La Crosse, Wisconsin